John Derrick (15 January 1963 – 22 March 2017)  was a Welsh cricketer, who played for Glamorgan County Cricket Club. He also spent some time in New Zealand with Northern Districts.

Derrick was born in Cwmaman, and began his playing career with Aberdare Cricket Club. Following his retirement from playing, he became coach of Glamorgan, initially as an assistant to Duncan Fletcher and led them to National League victory in 2002 and 2004 as well as overseeing their promotion to Division One of the County Championship. He left his position as coach in 2007 and in 2007 became national performance director of the Cricket Board of Wales.

He suffered a stroke in 2016 and was found to be suffering from a brain tumour.  He died on 22 March 2017 at the age of 54.

References

External links
 

1963 births
2017 deaths
Welsh cricketers
Glamorgan cricketers
Northern Districts cricketers
Wales National County cricketers
Minor Counties cricketers
Welsh cricket coaches
Deaths from brain cancer in the United Kingdom